Johannes Bonemilch (died 1510) was a Roman Catholic prelate who served as Auxiliary Bishop of Mainz (1497–1510).

Biography
On 4 Dec 1497, Johannes Bonemilch was appointed during the papacy of Pope Alexander VI as Auxiliary Bishop of Mainz and Titular Bishop of Sidon. On 13 Dec 1497, he was consecrated bishop. He served as Auxiliary Bishop of Mainz until his resignation in Apr 1508. He died on 17 Oct 1510.

References

External links and additional sources
 (for Chronology of Bishops) 
 (for Chronology of Bishops)  

15th-century Roman Catholic bishops in the Holy Roman Empire
16th-century Roman Catholic bishops in the Holy Roman Empire
Bishops appointed by Pope Alexander VI
1510 deaths